Grainsby is a hamlet and civil parish in the East Lindsey district of Lincolnshire, England. The nearest village is North Thoresby,  to the south-east.

Grainsby church is dedicated to St Nicholas.

Grainsby Hall 
Grainsby Hall was a country estate close to Grainsby.

In the 18th century Grainsby Hall was owned by the Nettleship-family. Francis Nettleship, who was the last member of the family, died in 1797. He left most of his property to his servant Elizabeth Borrell, who already owned land and the mansion house. When she died in 1826, the property was inherited by her niece Elizabeth Charlotte Borrell, who married William Haigh of Halifax in 1827. Their son was George Henry Haigh (1829-1887), the father of George Henry Caton Haigh.

In 1905 The Haigh-family arranged that a railway halt was built, 2 km from the Hall, Grainsby Halt railway station on the East Lincolnshire Railway. The station closed in 1952.

Grainsby Hall was demolished in 1972. The only part that now remains is a stable block, that is a Grade II listed building.

References

External links 
 "Grainsby", Genuki.org.uk
 "Grainsby Lincolnshire", A Vision of Britain through Time. Retrieved 23 June 2013
 "Listed Buildings in Grainsby, East Lindsey, Lincolnshire", British Listed Buildings. Retrieved 25 April 2020
 Image of Grainsby Hall around 1965. Retrieved 25 April 2020
 Grainsby Hall and Park at Lincs to the past. Retrieved 24 April 2020

East Lindsey District
Hamlets in Lincolnshire
Civil parishes in Lincolnshire